NASSA Group of Industries was founded in 1990 by Nazrul Islam Mazumder. It is one of Bangladesh's largest industrial conglomerate 

NASSA Group Limited has interests in Garment Manufacturing, Banking, Real Estate, Stock Brokering, Education and Travel.

History

The first venture

In 1990, Nazrul Islam Mazumder, along with his colleagues Saiful Islam, Mamun Abdullah, Nazrul Islam Swapan, Mr Altaf and the late Mr Kamrul, started their first factory, Starlight Knit-wear, under the NASSA Group's banner. The factory is still located at 2/b Elephant road, Dhaka, and had an employee count of 300 people, to contrast that with the 30,000+ people being employed by NASSA at the moment. Nazrul Islam Swapan left the company in 2010 over a dispute over ownership with Nazrul Islam Mazumder.

Then along the line in 1999, EXIM Bank was incorporated into the NASSA Group.

In 2017, after the Government of Bangladesh used intelligence agencies to remove the directors of Islami Bank Bangladesh, seven companies of NASSA received loans from the Bank without adequate collateral. NASSA group has defaulted on its loans in the past.

Products and services

Apparel

The biggest export of Bangladesh is the garment apparel sector and since opening in 1990, NASSA Group has rapidly expanded to become one of the largest international apparel and textile manufacturing conglomerates serving fashion, private and brand labels in the US, Canada, Mexico and the EU. NASSA Group's Ready Made Garment and textile manufacturing division is a supplier of yarns, textiles and ready-made garments for branded and private label clients worldwide. The manufacturing operation boasts 1.1 million sq. ft. of production space, across which more than 30,000 skilled workers operate in 34 vertically owned factories. NASSA Group generating a turnover of US$370 million in 2013 through its contracts with distinguished high street retailers across the UK and US.

RMG
The ready-made garment industry accounts for 75 percent of Bangladesh's exports and NASSA Group is the biggest manufacturer of the product in the country.

Banking
EXIM Bank (Export Import Bank of Bangladesh Limited) is one of the leading private commercial banks in the country. This Bank came into operation as scheduled commercial bank on 3 August 1999 as per rules and regulations of Bangladesh Bank. Of its very beginning EXIM Bank Bangladesh limited was known as BEXIM Bank Limited. But some legal constraints the bank renamed as EXIM Bank, which means Export Import Bank of Bangladesh Limited. At present the bank is performing its work all over the country by 52 branches. The bank has migrated all of its conventional banking operation into Shariah based Islamic banking

EXIM is the first privately owned bank to open an exchange house in the UK. They have also opened exchange houses in Canada, New York and Australia.

Education
EXIM Bank Agricultural University, Bangladesh(EBAUB), a private agricultural university at Chapainawabgang, Rajshahi.

Controversies

Factory closure

In awake of the Rana plaza collapse, which is considered to be the deadliest garment-factory accident in history, NASSA Group shut down three of its factories. It was insinuated in a couple of articles that this was a reactionary response to the Rana plaza collapse rather than a proactive step to ensure the safety of the workers, but it was established that the company made the decision before the 24 April collapse because of structural concerns about the rental space that housed the three facilities and says it is committed to the safety and security of its employees. Before the closures, which took effect on 28 April, Nassa Group operated 34 factories in Bangladesh.

In an earlier version of an article in The Wall Street Journal, stated that due to the structural integrity being compromised, the government took action to close the factories down, which turned out to be wrong information. The chairman of NASSA Group, Nazrul Islam Mazumder appointed Mishcon de Reya to challenge Wall Street Journal, as NASSA Group had already decided to close the factories on their own accord before 24 April collapse, after which WSJ were compelled to change the article to reflect the facts.

Company Milestones

1990: NASSA Group established by Founder and chairman Mr Nazrul Islam Mazumder.
1995: NASSA Group established its Hong Kong sourcing office.
1999: EXIM Bank established, providing financial services for the retail, corporate, SME and agricultural sectors as well as in foreign trade.
2002: NASSA Taipei Textile Mills established, integrating textile production capacity into the group.
2005: NASSA Taipei Denims Ltd established, diversifying into the global denims market.
2005: NASSA Spinning Ltd established, embedding wholly owned spinning operations into the group.
2007: NASSA Properties Ltd established, investing in Dhaka's commercial infrastructure via large scale commercial property investment.
2008: RANS Real Estate Ltd established.
2009: EXIM Bank becomes the first privately owned bank to open an exchange house in the UK.
2012: ANW Associates London Ltd established.
2013: NASSA brokerage house established.
2014: ANW Associates Nigeria Ltd established.

References

== External links ==

Companies based in Dhaka
Conglomerate companies established in 1990
Conglomerate companies of Bangladesh
Multinational companies
Bangladeshi companies established in 1990